Neville Chesters (born 25 June 1945) is a former rock music manager and road manager who has worked with The Jimi Hendrix Experience, The Who, Cream, Emerson, Lake & Palmer, Bee Gees, The Merseybeats, Stray Dog and numerous other bands.

Early years
Neville Chesters was born in Keighley, Yorkshire, England on 25 June 1945.

He initially studied animal husbandry at Askham Bryan College, ultimately completing 
Stage 1 and Stage 2 degrees in that field.

1960s
Moving to Liverpool in 1963, he became road manager for The Merseybeats from 1963 through 1964.

After relocating to London in 1964, he then became road manager for The Who between 1965 and 1966.

In 1967, he was assistant to Robert Stigwood which involved working for the bands Cream and The Bee Gees.

Later on, he also worked for Brian Epstein at NEMS Enterprises, which involved various projects with The Beatles and other NEMS artists (Sunday Night At The Saville Theatre).

From 1967 to 1968, he worked as the road manager for The Jimi Hendrix Experience, 
touring extensively and internationally with the band.

During this time, Neville shared a flat with Jimi Hendrix's bass player Noel Redding and with Lemmy Kilmister of Hawkwind and Motörhead fame.
Additionally, Neville secured a position for Lemmy as a roadie with the Hendrix band.

From 1968-1969, he worked as assistant A&R to Peter Asher at Apple Records.

Taking a break from the entertainment field, Neville bought a farm in Cornwall, living and farming there peacefully for the next two years.

1970s
Chesters moved back to London in 1972 and re-entered the rock business, resuming road manager duties; this time working for Greg Lake of Emerson, Lake and Palmer.

In Denver, he met a band (then called Aphrodite) and took them back to England, successfully procuring a record deal for them  with E.L.P. Manticore Records as the band Stray Dog which featured band members W.G. Snuffy Walden, Alan Roberts and Les Sampson.
He toured with them until 1974.

He went on to work for Electro-Sound, a full-service staging/sound equipment/ P.A./ lighting and touring production company

In 1975, he moved to Woburn, Bedfordshire and started a successful antiques renovation company known as Yesterdays Pine, specialising in antique and reproduction pine furniture and "collectabillia".

1990s to present
Moving to New York City in 1990, Neville Chesters started a film and video company located at his own residence, otherwise known as "The Loft".

Documenting his fascinating journey into the world of the adult film industry as producer and director Neville Chambers, he was recently featured in an extensive autobiographical 
and delightfully anecdotal taped interview with Ashley West of The Rialto Report.

He continues to be the subject of interviews and documentaries concerning his years working for The Jimi Hendrix Experience and other legendary bands.

Neville is currently back in England chronicling his memoirs about his singular career as a respected and much sought-after roadie in the rock 'n' roll industry.

References

External links
The Who’s PA:  1963–1966
Anyway, Anyhow, Anywhere: The Complete Chronicle of the Who 1958-1978  by Andrew Neill, Matthew Kent, Roger Daltrey, Chris Stamp
Jimi Hendrix, electric gypsy  by Harry Shapiro, Caesar Glebbeek
 Jimi Hendrix: the ultimate experience  by Johnny Black
Are you experienced?: the inside story of the Jimi Hendrix Experience by Noel Redding, Carol Appleby
Interview With "Lemmy" from Motorhead -  Experience Hendrix Magagazine -  Winter 2000 -  "You'll Never See Someone Like Hendrix Again" -  Interview By Steven C. Pesant
Neville Chester's Hendrix Tour Diary
JIMIHENDRIX Italia agosto 2008

May 21,1968 - Back in London, Noel Redding offers Neville Chesters a job as Road Manager for the upcoming Experience tour of Italy
Camion Blanc: Hard Rock & Heavy Metal - 40 Années De Purgatoire - Tome 3 by Thierry Aznar
Lemmy Remembered By The Man Who Gave Him That Hendrix Gig
How Jimi Hendrix’s Roadie became a Porn Producer - Autobiographical Interview With Ashley West Of The Rialto Report - Podcast 77
IMDb Page For Neville Chambers
The Patch - BBC Radio 4

1945 births
Jimi Hendrix
The Who
Cream (band)
English music managers
Road crew
Living people
People from Keighley